Daniel Reed (July 15, 1858 – 1935) was a farmer and politician in Ontario, Canada. He represented Wentworth South in the Legislative Assembly of Ontario from 1905 to 1911 as a Liberal.

The son of Henry Reed and Janet McDougal, he was born in Mimosa and was educated in Brantford.  In 1886, he married Mary J. Dickenson.  Reed served on the township council, also serving as reeve, and served on the county council.

References

External links

1858 births
1935 deaths
Ontario Liberal Party MPPs